Frøylandsvatnet is a lake in the municipality of Sandnes in Rogaland county, Norway. The lake empties into a small river that runs out of the north end of the lake. The river runs through Hommersåk into an arm of the Gandsfjorden.

See also
List of lakes in Norway

References

Lakes of Rogaland
Sandnes